Museo Sarmiento  (Sarmiento Museum) may refer to three museums dedicated to Domingo Sarmiento, the 7th President of Argentina (from 1868 to 1874):

 Sarmiento House, in the northern Buenos Aires suburb of Tigre
 Sarmiento historic museum, in the Belgrano district of Buenos Aires
 Casa Domingo Faustino Sarmiento, in San Juan, Argentina